Augusto Santamaria (born )is a Filipino retired volleyball coach who mentored the Philippine women's national team and the University of Santo Tomas Tigresses volleyball team.

Career
A native of Calabanga, Camarines Sur
, Santamaria has coached the Philippine women's national team in multiple occasions. He coach the squad which played in the 1997 Asian Women's Volleyball Championship and the 1997 Southeast Asian Games in Jakarta.

Santamaria has also led the University of Santo Tomas Tigresses volleyball team as its head coach last guiding them in University Athletic Association of the Philippines (UAAP) Season 69 in 2007. UST won the women's volleyball title in that season. He suffered a stroke in 2008 which ended his coaching career.

References

 

Filipino volleyball coaches
Volleyball coaches of international teams
Living people
1940s births

Year of birth uncertain